The Order of Myths is a 2008 documentary film directed by Margaret Brown. It focuses on the Mardi Gras celebrations in Mobile, Alabama, the oldest in the United States. It reveals the separate mystic societies established and maintained by Black and White groups, and acknowledges the complex racial history of a city with a slaveholding past. 

While showing the mystic societies' ties to economic, class and racial stratification, the film showed the beginnings of interaction between the Black and White courts. It tells some of the history of Africatown, a community formed north of Mobile in 1860 by Africans from Ghana, transported illegally as slaves to Mobile decades after the end of the slave trade.

The film competed in the Documentary Competition at the 2008 Sundance Film Festival. It had a limited release in New York in July 2008, and ran on Independent Lens, a PBS series featuring independent films, in 2009. It was distributed by The Cinema Guild.

Critical reception
The film appeared on several critics' top-ten lists of the best films of 2008. Andrew O'Hehir of Salon named it the 9th-best film of 2008, as did Ella Taylor of LA Weekly (along with Moving Midway) and Wesley Morris of The Boston Globe.

References

External links

The Order of Myths (2008), documentary by Margaret Brown about Mobile Mardi Gras, website

2008 films
American independent films
Films shot in Mobile, Alabama
American documentary films
Documentary films about racism in the United States
Documentary films about American politics
Mardi Gras
Documentary films about Alabama
2000s English-language films
2000s American films